is a Japanese former actor from Seto, Aichi. He is the twin brother of actor Manpei Takagi; both are affiliated with Stardust Promotion.

Filmography

TV drama 
 Juken Sentai Gekiranger as Fake Retsu (2007; episode 38)
 Mei-chan no Shitsuji as Akabane Sakon (2009)
 Drifting Net Cafe (2009)
 Meitantei no Okite as Okawara in highschool (ep9) (2009)
 Ninkyō Helper as Koga Kosuke (2009)
 Indigo no Yoru (2010)
 Ouran High School Host Club as Hitachiin Hikaru (2011)
 Shirato Osamu no Jikenbo (2012)
 Unofficial Sentai Akibaranger as Takuma Tsuzuki/New Akiba Red (2012; episodes 10–11)

Stage 
 The Prince of Tennis Musical (2006-2007)
 Kazegatsu yoku Fuiteiru (2009)

Film 
 Arena Romance (2007)
 Ouran High School Host Club as Hitachiin Hikaru  (2012)

Anime 
Yu-Gi-Oh! Arc-V - Yugo

References

Official profile at Stardust Promotion 
Official blog 

1985 births
Living people
People from Seto, Aichi
Actors from Aichi Prefecture
Identical twin male actors
Stardust Promotion artists
Japanese male voice actors
Japanese twins
Nagoya University alumni